Neihu District is a district of Taipei City, Taiwan. Neihu means "inner lake." The older name originates from the Ketagalan word Tayour (transliterated by the Dutch as Cattajo), meaning woman's head ornament.

Many mountainous roads and paths, which are ideal for hiking, connect Neihu with the neighboring Shilin District and Yangmingshan National Park. The Tri-Service General Hospital, which is a teaching hospital of the National Defense Medical Center, is also in Neihu. The Wuchih Mountain Military Cemetery borders Neihu.

History
During Japanese rule, Naiko Village covered modern day Neihu in addition to Nangang. The village was under Shichisei District, Taihoku Prefecture.

Economy

Although it was a flood-prone region, Neihu has experienced huge growth with the construction of the Neihu Technology Park in 1995 and hypermarkets such as Costco, RT Mart, Carrefour, B&Q. The extension of the Taipei Metro to Neihu in the 1990s and early 2000s has also boosted residential and commercial growth. TransAsia Airways, Delta Electronics and RT-Mart have their headquarters in the district. Neihu is the location of the Garena e-Sports Stadium, which is host to the League of Legends Masters Series, the premier League of Legends esports professional video game league in Taiwan, Hong Kong, and Macau.

Topography 
Straightening of the Keelung River, which runs along Neihu's southern and eastern borders has changed the natural boundaries of the district at several points in the latter 20th century.

Institutions
 American Institute in Taiwan

Education

Universities and colleges
 National Taiwan College of Performing Arts
 Takming University of Science and Technology
 University of Kang Ning

High schools
 Taipei Municipal Nei-Hu Vocational High School (1986)
 Taipei Municipal Neihu Senior High School (1988)
 Taipei Municipal Lishan Senior High School (2000)
 St. Francis High School

Infrastructure
 Neihu Refuse Incineration Plant
 Taipei Public Library Neihu Branch
 Taipei Public Library Donghu Branch
 Taipei Public Library Xihu Branch

Industry
 Neihu Technology Park
 Neihu Flower Market

Tourist attractions
Neihu's attractions include Dahu Park, famous for its picturesque footbridge, Bihu Park, where cherry blossoms can be viewed in the spring, and Bishan Temple, a large Taoist temple dedicated to Chen Yuanguang or Kai Zhang Sheng Wang on the mountainside that affords a panoramic view of Taipei. In the vicinity of Bishan Temple are a number of other Taoist and Buddhist temples, as well as orchards and fruit farms where tourists can pick their own fruit. An extensive network of hiking trails criss-crosses the mountainous regions of the northern part of Neihu.

There are many popular restaurants in the Neihu area, including Journey Kaffe, a restaurant where patrons can make their own pizza, and Holly Brown Coffee, a cafe popular for its extravagant milkshakes.

Other tourist attractions are Guo Ziyi Memorial Hall.

Transportation

The district is served by the Wenhu line of Taipei Metro. Stations located within the district are Donghu metro station, Huzhou metro station, Dahu Park metro station, Neihu metro station, Wende metro station, Gangqian metro station and Xihu metro station.

The Circular line will service Neihu in the future.

See also

 District (Taiwan)

References

External links 

  
 About Neihu District - City of Taipei

Districts of Taipei
High-technology business districts